Sager is a surname. Notable people with the surname include:
 Bobby Sager, entrepreneur turned philanthropist, and inspiration for The Philanthropist television series
 Carole Bayer Sager (born 1947), American lyricist, songwriter, and singer
 Craig Sager (1951–2016), American broadcaster
 Dirk Sager (1940–2014), German journalist
 Gareth Sager (born 1960), British musician
 Lawrence G. Sager (born 1941), American university dean
 Pony Sager (1848–1928), American baseball player
 Rabeh Sager (born 1964), Arabic singer
 Ruth Sager, (1918–1997), American geneticist
 Sidney Sager (1917–2002), British composer and musician
 Sager orphans, seven orphans on a trek to Oregon in 1844

See also
 Sager House, official residence of the Prime Minister of Sweden
 Sager Electronics, a U.S.-based distributor of electronic components